Max van Loon (13 January 1927 – 3 June 2000) was a Dutch equestrian. He competed in two events at the 1952 Summer Olympics.

References

1927 births
2000 deaths
Dutch male equestrians
Olympic equestrians of the Netherlands
Equestrians at the 1952 Summer Olympics
Sportspeople from Tilburg